USS Hargood has been the name of more than one United States Navy ship, and may refer to:

 , a patrol frigate transferred to the United Kingdom prior to completion which served in the Royal Navy as the frigate  from 1943 to 1946

United States Navy ship names